The Big T.N.T. Show is a 1966 concert film. Directed by Larry Peerce and distributed by American International Pictures, it includes performances by numerous popular rock and roll and R&B musicians from the United States and the United Kingdom.

A sequel to 1964's The T.A.M.I. Show, and, like it, executive produced by Henry G. Saperstein, The Big T.N.T. Show was likewise shot on videotape and transferred to 35-millimeter film. Some footage from it was reused in the film That Was Rock a.k.a. The T.A.M.I. / T.N.T. Show (1984).

The concert was shot before a live audience at the Moulin Rouge club at 6230 Sunset Boulevard Los Angeles, California on November 29, 1965. During the opening sequence of audience shots, Ron Mael and Russell Mael, who would later form the band Sparks can be seen at 4.44 and Sky Saxon, singer and frontman for The Seeds can be seen at 5.21. Frank Zappa appears very briefly in the movie (6.30) as an audience member and can also be seen in the movie's trailer. Marilyn McCoo of the Fifth Dimension also appears as one of the backing singers during Ray Charles' performance.  Its pre-release title was This Could Be the Night. The film's theme song, "This Could Be the Night", was written by Harry Nilsson, produced by Phil Spector, and performed by the Modern Folk Quartet.

Reception
Bruce Eder in Allmovie said, "The picture is a '60s pop-culture maven's dream – but nowhere near as musically revelatory as the list of talent would lead one to expect".

List of performers
In order of appearance in the film:

 David McCallum, emcee, conducting the orchestra
"(I Can't Get No) Satisfaction" (instrumental)
 Ray Charles
"What'd I Say"
 Petula Clark
"Downtown"
 The Lovin' Spoonful
"Do You Believe in Magic", "You Didn't Have to Be So Nice"
Bo Diddley
"Hey Bo Diddley", "Bo Diddley"
Joan Baez
"500 Miles", "There but for Fortune"
 Ray Charles (reprise)
"Georgia on My Mind"
"Let the Good Times Roll"
 Joan Baez (reprise) with Phil Spector on piano
"You've Lost That Loving Feeling"
The Ronettes
"Be My Baby", "Shout"
Roger Miller
"Dang Me", "Engine Engine #9", "King of the Road", "England Swings"
The Byrds
"Turn! Turn! Turn! (To Everything There Is a Season)", "The Bells of Rhymney", "Mr. Tambourine Man"
 Petula Clark (reprise)
"You're the One", "My Love"
Donovan
"Universal Soldier", "Summer Day Reflection Songs", "Bert's Blues", "Sweet Joy"
The Ike & Tina Turner Revue
"Shake", "A Fool In Love", "It's Gonna Work Out Fine", "Please, Please, Please", "Goodbye, So Long," "Tell the Truth"
David McCallum (reprise) conducting the orchestra
"1-2-3" (instrumental)

See also
List of American films of 1966

References

External links
Theatrical trailer (50 seconds)
 

1966 films
American documentary films
American International Pictures films
1966 documentary films
Concert films
Films directed by Larry Peerce
1960s English-language films
1960s American films